Krishnanagar Debnath High School is Higher Secondary school of Krishnanagar, Nadia in the Indian state of West Bengal.

History
Debnath High School was established in 1873 by a local educationist Debnath Mallick, a teacher of C.M.S St. John's High School of Krishnagar. It was known as Goari Hindu School at first. This school started with only 3 teachers and 30 students. Zamindar Brindaban Sarkar and businessman Rameswar Kundu donated lands and money for the development of the school.

Notable alumni
 Pramatha Chaudhuri, eminent Bengali writer
 Hemendra Prosad Ghosh, former editor of the Basumati

See also
Education in India
List of schools in India
Education in West Bengal

References

External links

Schools in Colonial India
High schools and secondary schools in West Bengal
Schools in Nadia district
Educational institutions established in 1873
Krishnanagar
1873 establishments in British India